Meadowbank railway station may refer to:
 Meadowbank railway station, Sydney, Australia
 Meadowbank railway station, Auckland in New Zealand
 Meadowbank Stadium railway station, a closed railway station in Edinburgh, Scotland